A Digital researcher is a person who uses digital technology such as computers or smartphones and the Internet to do research (see also Internet research). Digital research differs from Internet research in that digital researchers use the Internet as a research tool rather than the Internet itself as the subject of study. A digital researcher seeks knowledge as part of a systematic investigation with the specific intent of publishing research findings in an online open access journal or by other social media information exchange formats.

Although digital research can be both quantitative and qualitative, it does not necessarily follow strict Internet research ethics using the formal scientific method, as it involves collaboration using social media with public input for research and knowledge mobilization. There are a number of objections to this stance, which are all relevant to Wikipedia research and research ethics, for example the blurring of public and private spaces on the internet.

Digital research may also be formally published in academia through peer-reviewed journals or through the further use of social media. Digital researchers are involved with basic research or applied research using data analysis software which includes, but is not limited to, SPSS or JMP.

The term Digital Research was originally used to describe a now defunct company created by Dr. Gary Kildall to market and develop his CP/M operating system and related products. It was the first large software company in the microcomputer world.

The term Digital Researcher was also used by UK researcher development organization Vitae to form an event for postgraduate researchers and research staff focusing on the use of technology by researchers for collaboration, information gathering, and dissemination. The event encouraged researchers to become digital researchers.

References

 Ferguson, Rebecca (2010). Internet research ethics. Slideshare presentation (12 slides). "Which ethics apply to Internet research? If the Internet is conceptualised as space, then social science research ethics apply. However, if it is conceptualised as text/art, then the ethics of the humanities are more relevant."
 Berry, David M. (2004). Internet Research: Privacy, Ethics and Alienation - An Open Source Approach. The Journal of Internet Research, 14(4) PDF, 105 KB. Emphasis on Internet research ethics within the larger context of "open-source ethics".
 Gunther Eysenbach and James Till. Ethical issues in qualitative research on Internet communities. BMJ 2001(10 November); 323(7321): 1103–1105. Emphasis on a perspective from the biomedical and health sciences.
 Charles Ess and the ethics working committee of the Association of Internet Researchers. Provides access to the Ethics Working Committee document on Internet research ethics that was approved by voting members of the AoIR on November 27, 2002 Recommendations from the aoir ethics working committee1, 330 KB.
 Internet Research Ethics: Introduction. An introduction, by Charles Ess, to papers that emerged from a panel presentation organized for a conference held at Lancaster University on December 14- December 16, 2001, building on the efforts of the Ethics Working Committee of the Association of Internet Researchers (AoIR). Emphasis on perspectives of researchers and scholars in the social sciences and humanities.
 Ethical and Legal Aspects of Human Subjects Research in Cyberspace. Provides access to a report of a workshop held in Washington DC on June 10- June 11, 1999 PDF, 65 KB. Includes useful references to the earlier literature.
 Johns, M. D., Chen, S., & Hall, G. J. (Eds.). (2004). Online Social Research: Methods, Issues & Ethics. Digital formations (p. 273). New York: P. Lang.
 Elizabeth Buchanan (ed.) (2004). Readings in Virtual Research Ethics: Issues and Controversies. Hershey: Idea Group.
 Charles Ess, (2009) Digital Media Ethics. London: Polity.
 Elizabeth Buchanan (forthcoming in 2010) "Internet Research Ethics: Past, Present, and Future" in Robert Burnett, Mia Consalvo, and Charles Ess (eds.), The Handbook of Internet Studies. Wiley-Blackwell.
 Boehlefeld, S. (1996). Doing the Right Thing: Ethical Cyber Research. The Information Society, 12(2)(2).
 Natalie Young (2006) Internet Research Ethics blog.

External links
Association of Internet Research Specialists - AOFIRS

Research
Information management